The 1991 Coppa Italia Final was the final of the 1990–91 Coppa Italia. The match was played over two legs on 30 May and 9 June 1991 between Roma and Sampdoria. 
Roma won 4–2 on aggregate.

First leg

Second leg

References
Coppa Italia 1990/91 statistics at rsssf.com

Coppa Italia Finals
Coppa Italia Final 1991
Coppa Italia Final 1991